Swing Vote is a 1999 American television drama film directed by David Anspaugh, written by Ronald Bass and Jane Rusconi, and starring Andy Garcia.  It features an alternative reality in which the Supreme Court of the United States has overturned the Roe v. Wade decision and the State of Alabama has subsequently charged a woman with first degree murder for having an abortion. It aired on ABC on April 19, 1999.

Story 
Joseph Kirkland has recently been appointed to the United States Supreme Court and is faced with an emotional issue: abortion. Virginia Mapes elected to have an abortion in Alabama, just before the law was enacted and is being charged with first degree murder. The Justices who want to overturn the law are in a minority, thus making Justice Kirkland a powerful swing vote.

Justice Kirkland faces competing arguments for and against legal abortion from other justices, his secretary and even his wife.  His final decision seeks to strike some sort of middle ground between the two political positions.

Cast
 Andy García as Joseph Michael Kirkland
 Harry Belafonte as Justice Will Dunn
 Robert Prosky as Chief Justice of the United States
 Ray Walston as Justice Clore Cawley
 James Whitmore as Justice Daniel Morissey
 Kate Nelligan as Justice Sara Marie Brandwynne
 Milo O'Shea as retired Justice Harlan Greene
 Albert Hall as Justice Hank Banks
 Bob Balaban as Justice Eli MacCorckle
 John Aylward as Justice Benjamin "Rip" Ripley
 LisaGay Hamilton as Virginia Mapes
 Margaret Colin as Linda Kirkland
 Hallie Eisenberg as Jenny Kirkland
 Michael O'Keefe as Arthur Jacklyn
 Tracey Ellis as Marley Terrell
 Hedy Burress as Calley McFearson

Production
Filming took place in Los Angeles.

References

External links
 

1999 films
1999 crime drama films
1990s English-language films
1990s legal films
American Broadcasting Company original programming
American alternate history films
American crime drama films
American drama television films
American legal drama films
Films about abortion
Films directed by David Anspaugh
Films scored by Harry Gregson-Williams
Films set in Alabama
Films shot in Los Angeles
Films with screenplays by Ronald Bass
1990s American films